The National Crime Agency Long Service and Good Conduct Medal is a service medal for National Crime Agency (NCA) officers of the United Kingdom. Instituted in March 2017, the medal is presented for twenty aggregate years of service.

Appearance
The medal is circular, 36 mm in diameter and is rhodium plated cupronickel. The obverse, designed by Ian Rank-Broadley, bears an effigy of Queen Elizabeth II with the wording ELIZABETH II DEI GRATIA REGINA FID DEF. The reverse has a portcullis representing primacy and compassion, flanked by a griffin representing bravery and truth, and a leopard representing valiance. The image is surrounded by the words 'NATIONAL CRIME AGENCY' and 'FOR EXEMPLARY SERVICE'. The suspender is of a straight non-swivelling type, the 32 mm wide ribbon being blue, with three narrow stripes of white, yellow and white at each edge. No bars for further service are authorised for this medal. Naming on the rim is in impressed capital letters.

Criteria
The medal is awarded for twenty aggregate years of service and good conduct in the National Crime Agency, including previous service in HM Revenue and Customs and the NCA's precursor agencies, the Serious Organised Crime Agency, National Criminal Intelligence Service and National Crime Squad.A total of 484 medals were awarded up to July 2017.

See also
Police Long Service and Good Conduct Medal

References

Civil awards and decorations of the United Kingdom
Law enforcement awards and honors
Awards established in 2017
2017 establishments in the United Kingdom
Long Service
Long and Meritorious Service Medals of Britain and the Commonwealth